16/330 Khajoor Road is the sixth album by the Indian band Indian Ocean, the first one after the tragic demise of Asheem Chakravarty. The band has added two new members for this album, Himanshu Joshi for vocals and Tuheen Chakravarty for Tabla and other percussion. Lyrics are penned by Sanjeev Sharma.

The album is named after this picturesque 100-year-old bungalow where Indian Ocean has been rehearsing and creating their music at since May 1997. This bungalow is located in the Karol Bagh area of Delhi. The band was offered this house by friends, Gurpreet Sidhu and Orijit Sen, who were living there at that time.

Track Listing

Free Downloads
Note: Released separately from -
"Chand"
"Shunya"
"Jogiya"
"Bondhu"
"Bula Rahaa"
"Sone Ki Nagari"
"Darte Ho"

Full Album ( Published as 2 Disc Album)
Track 1-7 on Disc-01, Track 8-14 on Disc-02

References

2011 albums
Indian Ocean (band) albums
2010 albums
Hindi-language albums
Albums free for download by copyright owner
Self-released albums